Phytochromes are a class of photoreceptor in plants, bacteria and fungi used to detect light. They are sensitive to light in the red and far-red region of the visible spectrum and can be classed as either Type I, which are activated by far-red light, or Type II that are activated by red light. Recent advances have suggested that phytochromes also act as temperature sensors, as warmer temperatures enhance their de-activation. All of these factors contribute to the plant's ability to germinate.

Phytochromes control many aspects of plant development. They regulate the germination of seeds (photoblasty), the synthesis of chlorophyll, the elongation of seedlings, the size, shape and number and movement of leaves and the timing of flowering in adult plants. Phytochromes are widely expressed across many tissues and developmental stages.

Other plant photoreceptors include cryptochromes and phototropins, which respond to blue and ultraviolet-A light and UVR8, which is sensitive to ultraviolet-B light.

In addition to their roles in nature, the light-induced interaction between a plant phytochrome and phytochrome-interacting factor (PIF) was used in 2002 to control gene transcription in yeast. This was the first example of using photoproteins from another organism for controlling a biochemical pathway.

Structure 
Phytochromes consist of a protein, covalently linked to a light-sensing bilin chromophore. The protein part comprises two identical chains (A and B). Each chain has a PAS domain, GAF domain and PHY domain. Domain arrangements in plant, bacterial and fungal phytochromes are comparable, insofar as the three N-terminal domains are always PAS, GAF and PHY domains. However C-terminal domains are more divergent. The PAS domain serves as a signal sensor and the GAF domain is responsible for binding to cGMP and also senses light signals. Together, these subunits form the phytochrome region, which regulates physiological changes in plants to changes in red and far red light conditions. In plants, red light changes phytochrome to its biologically active form, while far red light changes the protein to its biologically inactive form.

Isoforms and states 

Phytochromes are characterized by a red/far-red photochromicity. Photochromic pigments change their "color" (spectral absorbance properties) upon light absorption. In the case of phytochrome the ground state is Pr, the r indicating that it absorbs red light particularly strongly. The absorbance maximum is a sharp peak 650–670 nm, so concentrated phytochrome solutions look turquoise-blue to the human eye. But once a red photon has been absorbed, the pigment undergoes a rapid conformational change to form the Pfr state. Here fr indicates that now not red but far-red (also called "near infra-red"; 705–740 nm) is preferentially absorbed. This shift in absorbance is apparent to the human eye as a slightly more greenish color. When Pfr absorbs far-red light it is converted back to Pr. Hence, red light makes Pfr, far-red light makes Pr. In plants at least Pfr is the physiologically active or "signalling" state.

Phytochromes' effect on phototropism

Phytochromes also have the ability to sense light, which causes the plant to grow towards it. This is called phototropism. Janoudi and his fellow coworkers wanted to see what type of phytochrome was responsible for causing phototropism to occur, and performed a series of experiments. They found that blue light causes the plant Arabidopsis thaliana to exhibit a phototropic response; this curvature is heightened with the addition of red light. They also found that five different phytochromes were present in the plant, while some mutants that did not function properly expressed a lack of phytochromes. Two of these mutant variants were very important for this study: phyA-101 and phyB-1. These are the mutants of phytochrome A and B respectively. The normally functional phytochrome A causes a sensitivity to far red light, and it causes a regulation in the expression of curvature toward the light, whereas phytochrome B is more sensitive to the red light.

The experiment consisted in the wild-type form of Arabidopsis, phyA-101(phytochrome A (phyA) null mutant), phyB-1 (phytochrome B deficient mutant). They were then exposed to white light as a control blue and red light at different fluences of light, the curvature was measured. It was determined that in order to achieve a phenotype of that of the wild-type phyA-101 must be exposed to four orders of higher magnitude or about 100umol m−2 fluence. However, the fluence that causes phyB-1 to exhibit the same curvature as the wild-type is identical to that of the wild-type. The phytochrome that expressed more than normal amounts of phytochrome A it was found that as the fluence increased the curvature also increased up to 10umol-m−2 the curvature was similar to the wild-type. The phytochrome expressing more than normal amounts of phytochrome B exhibited curvatures similar to that of the wild type at different fluences of red light up until the fluence of 100umol-m−2 at fluences higher than this curvature was much higher than the wild-type.

Thus, the experiment resulted in the finding that another phytochrome than just phytochrome A acts in influencing the curvature since the mutant is not that far off from the wild-type, and phyA is not expressed at all. Thus leading to the conclusion that two phases must be responsible for phototropism. They determined that the response occurs at low fluences, and at high fluences. This is because for phyA-101 the threshold for curvature occurred at higher fluences, but curvature also occurs at low fluence values. Since the threshold of the mutant occurs at high fluence values it has been determined that phytochrome A is not responsible for curvature at high fluence values. Since the mutant for phytochrome B exhibited a response similar to that of the wild-type, it had been concluded that phytochrome B is not needed for low or high fluence exposure enhancement. It was predicted that the mutants that over expressed phytochrome A and B would be more sensitive. However, it is shown that an over expression of phy A does not really effect the curvature, thus there is enough of the phytochrome in the wild-type to achieve maximum curvature. For the phytochrome B over expression mutant higher curvature than normal at higher fluences of light indicated that phy B controls curvature at high fluences. Overall, they concluded that phytochrome A controls curvature at low fluences of light.

Phytochrome effect on root growth

Phytochromes can also affect root growth. It has been well documented that gravitropism is the main tropism in roots. However, a recent study has shown that phototropism also plays a role. A red light induced positive phototropism has been recently recorded in an experiment that used Arabidopsis to test where in the plant had the most effect on a positive phototropic response. The experimenters utilized an apparatus that allowed for root apex to be zero degrees so that gravitropism could not be a competing factor. When placed in red light, Arabidopsis roots displayed a curvature of 30 to 40 degrees. This showed a positive phototropic response in the red light. They then wanted to pinpoint exactly where in the plant light is received. When roots were covered there was little to no curvature of the roots when exposed to red light. In contrast, when shoots were covered, there was a positive phototropic response to the red light. This proves that lateral roots is where light sensing takes place. In order to further gather information regarding the phytochromes involved in this activity, phytochrome A, B, D and E mutants, and WT roots were exposed to red light. Phytochrome A and B mutants were severely impaired. There was no significant difference in the response of phyD and phyE compared with the wildtype, proving that phyA and phyB are responsible for positive phototropism in roots.

Biochemistry 
Chemically, phytochrome consists of a chromophore, a single bilin molecule consisting of an open chain of four pyrrole rings, covalently bonded to the protein moiety via highly conserved cysteine amino acid. It is the chromophore that absorbs light, and as a result changes the conformation of bilin and subsequently that of the attached protein, changing it from one state or isoform to the other.

The phytochrome chromophore is usually phytochromobilin, and is closely related to phycocyanobilin (the chromophore of the phycobiliproteins used 
by cyanobacteria and red algae to capture light for photosynthesis) and to the bile pigment bilirubin (whose structure is also affected by light exposure, a fact exploited in the phototherapy of jaundiced newborns).
The term "bili" in all these names refers to bile. Bilins are derived from the closed tetrapyrrole ring of haem by an oxidative reaction catalyzed by haem oxygenase to yield their characteristic open chain. Chlorophyll and haem (Heme) share a common precursor in the form of Protoporphyrin IX, and share the same characteristic closed tetrapyrrole ring structure. In contrast to bilins, haem and chlorophyll carry a metal atom in the center of the ring, iron or magnesium, respectively.

The Pfr state passes on a signal to other biological systems in the cell, such as the mechanisms responsible for gene expression. Although this mechanism is almost certainly a biochemical process, it is still the subject of much debate. It is known that although phytochromes are synthesized in the cytosol and the Pr form is localized there, the Pfr form, when generated by light illumination, is translocated to the cell nucleus. This implies a role of phytochrome in controlling gene expression, and many genes are known to be regulated by phytochrome, but the exact mechanism has still to be fully discovered. It has been proposed that phytochrome, in the Pfr form, may act as a kinase, and it has been demonstrated that phytochrome in the Pfr form can interact directly with transcription factors.

Discovery 
The phytochrome pigment was discovered by Sterling Hendricks and Harry Borthwick at the USDA-ARS Beltsville Agricultural Research Center in Maryland during a period from the late 1940s to the early 1960s. Using a spectrograph built from borrowed and war-surplus parts, they discovered that red light was very effective for promoting germination or triggering flowering responses. The red light responses were reversible by far-red light, indicating the presence of a photoreversible pigment.

The phytochrome pigment was identified using a spectrophotometer in 1959 by biophysicist Warren Butler and biochemist Harold Siegelman. Butler was also responsible for the name, phytochrome.

In 1983 the laboratories of Peter Quail and Clark Lagarias reported the chemical purification of the intact phytochrome molecule, and in 1985 the first phytochrome gene sequence was published by Howard Hershey and Peter Quail. By 1989, molecular genetics and work with monoclonal antibodies that more than one type of phytochrome existed; for example, the pea plant was shown to have at least two phytochrome types (then called type I (found predominantly in dark-grown seedlings) and type II (predominant in green plants)). It is now known by genome sequencing that Arabidopsis has five phytochrome genes (PHYA - E) but that rice has only three (PHYA - C). While this probably represents the condition in several di- and monocotyledonous plants, many plants are polyploid. Hence maize, for example, has six phytochromes - phyA1, phyA2, phyB1, phyB2, phyC1 and phyC2. While all these phytochromes have significantly different protein components, they all use phytochromobilin as their light-absorbing chromophore. Phytochrome A or phyA is rapidly degraded in the Pfr form - much more so than the other members of the family. In the late 1980s, the Vierstra lab showed that phyA is degraded by the ubiquitin system, the first natural target of the system to be identified in eukaryotes.

In 1996 David Kehoe and Arthur Grossman at the Carnegie Institution at Stanford University identified the proteins, in the filamentous cyanobacterium Fremyella diplosiphon called RcaE with similarly to plant phytochrome that controlled a red-green photoreversible response called chromatic acclimation and identified a gene in the sequenced, published genome of the cyanobacterium Synechocystis with closer similarity to those of plant phytochrome. This was the first evidence of phytochromes outside the plant kingdom. Jon Hughes in Berlin and Clark Lagarias at UC Davis subsequently showed that this Synechocystis gene indeed encoded a bona fide phytochrome (named Cph1) in the sense that it is a red/far-red reversible chromoprotein. Presumably plant phytochromes are derived from an ancestral cyanobacterial phytochrome, perhaps by gene migration from the chloroplast to the nucleus. Subsequently, phytochromes have been found in other prokaryotes including Deinococcus radiodurans and Agrobacterium tumefaciens. In Deinococcus phytochrome regulates the production of light-protective pigments, however in Synechocystis and Agrobacterium the biological function of these pigments is still unknown.

In 2005, the Vierstra and Forest labs at the University of Wisconsin published a three-dimensional structure of a truncated Deinococcus phytochrome (PAS/GAF domains). This paper revealed that the protein chain forms a knot - a highly unusual structure for a protein. In 2008, two groups around Essen and Hughes in Germany and Yang and Moffat in the US published the three-dimensional structures of the entire photosensory domain. One structures was for the Synechocystis sp. (strain PCC 6803) phytochrome in Pr and the other one for the Pseudomonas aeruginosa phytochrome in the Pfr state. The structures showed that a conserved part of the PHY domain, the so-called PHY tongue, adopts different folds. In 2014 it was confirmed by Takala et al that the refolding occurs even for the same phytochrome (from Deinococcus) as a function of illumination conditions.

Genetic engineering 
Around 1989, several laboratories were successful in producing transgenic plants which produced elevated amounts of different phytochromes (overexpression). In all cases the resulting plants had conspicuously short stems and dark green leaves. Harry Smith and co-workers at Leicester University in England showed that by increasing the expression level of phytochrome A (which responds to far-red light), shade avoidance responses can be altered. As a result, plants can expend less energy on growing as tall as possible and have more resources for growing seeds and expanding their root systems. This could have many practical benefits: for example, grass blades that would grow more slowly than regular grass would not require mowing as frequently, or crop plants might transfer more energy to the grain instead of growing taller.

References

Sources 
 
 "Tripping the Light Switch Fantastic", by Jim De Quattro, 1991.
 "Nature’s Timekeeping", by Kit Smith, 2004.
 Terry and Gerry Audesirk. Biology: Life on Earth.
 Linda C Sage. A pigment of the imagination: a history of phytochrome research. Academic Press 1992. 
 Gururani, Mayank Anand, Markkandan Ganesan, and Pill-Soon Song. "Photo-biotechnology as a tool to improve agronomic traits in crops." Biotechnology Advances (2014).

Plant physiology
Biological pigments
Sensory receptors